Bible translations into Romansh are about the translations of the Bible into Romansh, which is one of the "four approved languages" of Switzerland.

History
In the 16th century, the first Romansh Bible was made. In 1560, Jachiam Tütschett Bifruns, one of the men of Romansh literature, translated the Bible into Romansh, L'g Nuof Sainc Testamaint da nos Signer Jesu Christ.

In the 17th century, Romansh literature in Sursilvan, Sutsilvan and other dialects appeared. In 1648, Luci Gabriel published the New Testament in Sursilvan dialect. One of the reasons of the emergence of Romance literature in dialects is because each district had more Protestant or Catholic believers in majority.

From 1717 to 1719, the entire Bible, Bibla da Cuera, was published.

In the latter half of the 20th century, an ecumenical effort to translate the Bible from the original Hebrew and Greek texts into modern Romansh started between the Protestant and Roman Catholic people, with a plan to publish Bibla ecumena romontscha in five volumes. The New Testament was published in 1988, the Prophets of the Old Testament in 2004, and the Psalms in 2010. As of 2014, the Psalms have just been republished together with Songs. The Pentateuch and the History Books are forthcoming.

See also
Religion in Switzerland
Languages of Switzerland 
Canton of Grisons, the only canton where Romansh has official status

References

External links
Swiss Bible Society (in Biel/Bienne)
Geneva Bible Society

Romansh
Christianity in Switzerland
Romansh language